Freundel Jerome Stuart, OR, PC, SC (born 27 April 1951) is a Barbadian politician who served as seventh Prime Minister of Barbados and the leader of the Democratic Labour Party (DLP) from 23 October 2010 to 21 February 2013; and from 21 February 2013 to 25 May 2018.
He succeeded David Thompson, who had died in office on 23 October 2010 from pancreatic cancer.

Biography

Personal life and education 
Stuart was born in Saint Philip, Barbados. He is the father of one daughter.

An alumnus of the Christ Church Foundation School, Stuart is a graduate of the University of the West Indies at Cave Hill and holds degrees in Political Science and Law.  He is a lawyer and his practice encompasses criminal and corporate law.

In 1974, Stuart officially joined the Ministry of Education and became a Teacher in Princess margaret secondary (PMS).

He has supported several community organisations and sponsors the Dayrells United Achievers Community Club and the Notre Dame Sports Club.

Political career 
Stuart entered the Democratic Labour Party (DLP) in 1970 and served in the Senate of Barbados until 1994. He entered elective politics in 1994 and became a Member of parliament for St. Philip South until he was defeated by Barbados Labour Party representative Anthony Wood in the 1999 Barbadian general election. In 2003, Stuart switched Constituencies to St. Michael South but remained as a member of the Democratic Labour Party, he was defeated by Minister for Tourism and Transport Noel Lynch in the 2003 Barbadian general election. He contested in St. Michael South again in the 2008 Barbadian general election and defeated Noel Lynch this time. He represented the St. Michael South constituency.

Stuart was elected as 1st vice-president of the DLP and Deputy Leader of the Opposition in 1995. He served in that position until 2004.

Stuart was also appointed in 1995 as shadow deputy prime minister, shadow attorney general and shadow interior minister to serve in the Shadow Cabinet of David Thompson. He held those three positions until 20 January 2008.

In 2004, Stuart was elected as the leader and president of the DLP in a leadership election. Stuart narrowly defeated then DLP Leader Clyde Mascoll but remained as the Deputy Leader of the Opposition, while Thompson remained as Opposition Leader.

After the Democratic Labour Party won the 2008 Barbadian general election, Stuart was appointed deputy prime minister, Attorney-General of Barbados and minister of home affairs by Prime Minister David Thompson to serve in his cabinet. Stuart served in those three positions until May 2010.

7th prime minister of Barbados 

Stuart served as acting prime minister of Barbados from May 2010 when Prime Minister David Thompson became ill with pancreatic cancer. Adriel Brathwaite succeeded Stuart in the positions he then held, namely attorney-general and minister of home affairs. Thompson died on 23 October 2010. Leaders of the Democratic Labour Party held an emergency meeting at the party's headquarters in George Street in Bridgetown on the morning of Thompson's death, during which Stuart was chosen as the next Prime Minister.

Stuart was sworn in as the 7th Prime Minister of Barbados and Minister for National Security, the public service and Urban Development the same day by Governor-General Clifford Husbands.

In 2011, Stuart was appointed as a member of the UN Global Panel on Sustainability.

Stuart won his first election as Prime Minister on 21 February 2013, defeating Barbados Labour Party challenger (for his constituency) Noel Lynch.

On 24 January 2014 Stuart became a member of the Privy Council of the United Kingdom.

Stuart had announced changes for Barbados including his intention to turn Barbados into a republic and replace the Queen of Barbados with a ceremonial president as head of state. Ahead of the 2018 General Election Stuart stated if re-elected he would push for removal of Barbados from jurisdiction of the Caribbean Court of Justice (CCJ).

The DLP lost all of its seats in the May 2018 election to the Barbados Labour Party of Mia Mottley. It was the worst defeat of a sitting government in Barbadian history. Stuart himself was roundly defeated in his own seat, taking only 26.7 percent of the vote. (In September 2020, Mottley's government also proposed removing the Queen as head of state.) 

On 1 August 2018, Stuart stepped down as DLP leader and President, and a leadership election was held to fill up the position where the Candidate for Christ Church South Verla De Peiza won unopposed in the election. Verla De Peiza succeeded Stuart on the following day.

Honours and awards 
:
 Member of the Order of Roraima (O.R.)

References

Further reading

External links 

The Democratic Labour Party
Profile of Freundel Stuart
profile of Freundel Stuart, at the High-level Panel of the UN Secretary-General on Global Sustainability

|-

|-

|-

1951 births
Barbadian Queen's Counsel
Barbadian republicans
Democratic Labour Party (Barbados) politicians
Leaders of the Democratic Labour Party (Barbados)
Living people
Members of the House of Assembly of Barbados
Members of the Privy Council of the United Kingdom
People from Saint Philip, Barbados
Prime Ministers of Barbados
Deputy Prime Ministers of Barbados
Interior ministers of Barbados
University of the West Indies alumni
Republicanism in Barbados